Kiev Governorate (pre-reform Russian:), or the Government of Kiev, was an administrative division (a guberniya) of the Tsardom of Russia and then the Russian Empire. The government was established in December 1708 as one of the eight guberniyas first created during the reforms of Peter the Great.

Description
The Government of Kiev in the 18th century greatly differed from the Government of Kiev in the 19th century. When one was exclusively located on the left banks of Dnieper, the other one happened to be located across the river. In territorial reform of Catherine the Great changed the name for government to the Russian vice royalty in 1781. The first Government of Kiev was established on the most part of the Cossack Hetmanate including a vast territory to east of the Hetmanate as well, while the Zaporizhian Sich was in a condominium of the Russian Empire and the Polish–Lithuanian Commonwealth.

In 1727, it was split into Government of Kiev and Government of Belgorod, becoming a separate province under government of Hetman Apostol. In 1764 there was another division when the government of Little Russia and New Russia were established. 

In 1781, the governments of Kiev and Little Russia were reorganized into vice-royalties of Kiev, Novhorod-Siversky, and Chernihiv soon after the partition of Poland (Polish–Lithuanian Commonwealth). In 1796 the vice-royalty of Kiev was renamed back into the Government of Kiev.

The borders of the Governorate underwent significant changes, in particular in 1796 when most of its territory was relocated from the left-bank Ukraine to the right-bank Ukraine. Kiev was the administrative centre of the guberniya.

Foundation and early reforms

As with the rest of the governorates, neither the borders nor internal subdivisions of Kiev Governorate were defined; instead, the territory was defined as a set of cities and the lands adjacent to those cities. The original territory was roughly based on the Siever land surrounded by Smolensk, Moscow, and Azov Governorates.

Additionally, seventeen cities (according to the source; only sixteen were actually listed) of Azov Governorate were assigned to Kiev due to their greater geographical proximity to Kiev than to Azov. Among such cities were Kharkov and Staroy Oskol. Also to Kiev was assigned Trubchevsk and two other cities from Smolensk Governorate while some cities of Kiev were assigned to Azov and Smolensk, respectively.

As the administrative unit, the governorate was preceded by the Regimental division of the Cossack Hetmanate. Remarkable is the fact that both divisions existed through most of the 18th century during which the Regimental division as administrative was phased away and later existed solely for military purposes. At the time of its foundation the governorate covered  of territory of parts of modern Ukraine and southwestern Russia.

Initially divided into uyezds and razryads, the governorate abolished the obsolete administrative system of the rapidly growing empire. During the administrative reform of 1710, all governorates where subdivided into administrative-fiscal lots (doli), and Kiev Governorate consisted of five lots. The lots were administer by landrats, from the German land-councilor.

A new reform edict was issued on May 29, 1719. Lots were abolished and the governorate was subdivided into four provinces centered on Belgorod, Kiev, Oryol, and Sevsk, and named accordingly. By 1719, the Governorate comprised forty-one cities. The provinces, in their turn, were divided into districts. Despite the reform, the subdivision of the Governorate into regiments was still used in parallel with the provinces.

In the course of the 1727 administrative reform, Belgorod, Oryol and Sevsk Provinces were split off into Belgorod Governorate, with only Kiev Province left in the Kiev Governorate. The guberniya at this time was divided into uyezds that replaced districts.

See also
Truce of Andrusovo
Cossack Hetmanate

References

External links
 Shcherbina, V. Kiev voivodes, governors, and general governors from 1654 to 1775 (Кіевскіе воеводы, губеранаторы и генералъ-губернаторы отъ 1654 по 1775 г.). "Lectures in the Nestor the Chronicler Historical Society (Чтенія въ историческомъ обществЂ Нестора лЂтописца)". Kiev 1892.

 
Governorates of the Russian Empire
Governorates of Ukraine
History of Chernihiv Oblast
History of Sumy Oblast
History of Kharkiv Oblast
History of Kyiv
1708 establishments in Russia
1764 disestablishments in the Russian Empire